Talusan, officially the Municipality of Talusan (Chavacano: Municipalidad de Talusan), is a 5th class municipality in the province of Zamboanga Sibugay, Philippines. According to the 2020 census, it has a population of 27,873 people.

It is the second least populous municipality in the province and the smallest in area.

The municipality is located in the central part of Olutanga Island.

Geography

Barangays
Talusan is politically subdivided into 14 barangays.
 Aurora
 Baganipay
 Bolingan
 Bualan
 Cawilan
 Florida
 Kasigpitan
 Laparay
 Mahayahay
 Moalboal
 Poblacion (Talusan)
 Sagay
 Samonte
 Tuburan

Climate

Demographics

Economy

References

External links
 Talusan Profile at PhilAtlas.com
 [ Philippine Standard Geographic Code]
Philippine Census Information

Municipalities of Zamboanga Sibugay